John Ellis Rodley (February 2, 1852 – December 2, 1919) was the fourteenth President of the Chico Board of Trustees, the governing body of Chico, California from 1897 to 1899.

He was born February 2, 1852, in Galashiels, Selkirkshire, Scotland, the son of Edward Rodley and Sarah Ellis. His father Edward was a manufacturer of wool. His mother Sarah died in Scotland. The family emigrated to the United States in about 1868, and settled in Lebanon, Missouri.

Although, he was still very young at the time, John began his study of medicine under Dr. Hugh Falconer in Scotland. He continued his studies in America at Missouri Medical College (also called McDowell Medical College) in St. Louis from where he was graduated in 1881.

He began to practice medicine in Lebanon, where he resided until 1884. He moved to St. Louis, where he continued his practice for four more years, where he was on the Missouri Pacific Hospital, the railroad hospital. He also served as surgeon for the Missouri Pacific Railroad. In 1888, Dr. Rodley left Missouri for California and located in Chico.

In Chico, he practiced medicine, and served on the Chico Board of Trustees, and as its President. He owed four farms, where he raised grains, fruits and nuts.

In 1899, Rodley was sentenced to 12 years in prison after being found guilty of perjury in the witnessing of a forged will offered for probate. He was granted parole in 1906.

References 

1852 births
1919 deaths
American orchardists
American perjurers
Physicians from Missouri
California city council members
California Republicans
Mayors of Chico, California
People from Galashiels
Scottish emigrants to the United States
California politicians convicted of crimes
19th-century American politicians
19th-century American Episcopalians